The 1922 French Grand Prix (formally the XVI Grand Prix de l'Automobile Club de France) was a Grand Prix motor race held at Strasbourg on 15 July 1922. The race was run over 60 laps of the 13.38km circuit for a total distance of just over 800km and was won by Felice Nazzaro driving a Fiat. This race is notable as the first Grand Prix to feature a massed start.

The race was run to new Grand Prix regulations, requiring engines no larger than 2 litres, in cars with two seats and weighing at least 650kg. In practice, the Fiats were dominant, with only the Bugatti drivers close in times (the Bugatti drivers had the advantage of the Bugatti factory being in nearby Molsheim, so had already learned the circuit). After the rolling start, Felice Nazzaro lead Friderich at the end of the first lap, with the other Fiat drivers down in the pack due to their lower starting positions. By lap 4, Bordino had taken the lead, and by lap 10 Biagio Nazzaro was up to third, so Fiat lead 1-2-3. The two lead Fiats would trade the lead several times due to pitstops, with Biagio Nazzaro holding third, the three Fiats continuing to increase their lead whilst many of their competitors retired, until after halfway, Biagio Nazzaro experienced difficulties, and made a slow pitstop, dropping him to fourth until Foresti, who had taken third, retired on lap 44. With nearly all other competitors retired (mostly with engine problems), and the race nearing its end, Biagio Nazzaro's Fiat lost a rear wheel at top speed, then hit a tree, turning the car over and killing him instantly. With just two laps to go, Bordino suffered a similar failure at a much slower part of the track, his car stopping safely with a lost rear wheel. Felice Nazzaro was left to finish the race, winning by nearly an hour. It was later found that on all three Fiats the rear axle casings were faulty, with a large crack developing on Felice Nazzaro's.

Classification

References

French Grand Prix
French Grand Prix
1922 in French motorsport